Ubi primum may refer to :

Ubi primum (1740) is an encyclical of Pope Benedict XIV considered to be the first ever encyclical of the Catholic Church
Ubi primum (1824) is an encyclical of Pope Leo XII on his assuming the pontificate
Ubi primum (1847) is an encyclical of Pope Pius IX about discipline in religion
Ubi primum (1849) is an encyclical of Pope Pius IX to the bishops of the Catholic Church asking them for opinion on the definition of a dogma on the Immaculate Conception of the Virgin Mary
Ubi primum (1898) is an apostolic constitution by Pope Leo XIII regarding the Confraternity of the Rosary